Acrobasis homoeosomidia is a species of snout moth in the genus Acrobasis. It was described by George Hampson in 1901. It is found in Peninsular Malaysia.

References

Moths described in 1901
Acrobasis
Moths of Asia